Séamus McHugh (born 26 March 1956) is an Irish former Gaelic footballer. His league and championship career at senior level with the Galway county team spanned thirteen seasons from 1975 until 1988.

Honours
Galway
 Connacht Senior Football Championship (6): 1976, 1982, 1983 (c), 1984 (c), 1986, 1987

References

 

1956 births
Living people
All Stars Awards winners (football)
Galway inter-county Gaelic footballers
Headford Gaelic footballers